Vương Quốc Trung (born 29 May 1990) is a Vietnamese footballer who plays as a midfielder for V.League 2 club Phù Đổng.

References

1990 births
Living people
Vietnamese footballers
Association football midfielders
Song Lam Nghe An FC players
Haiphong FC players
V.League 1 players
Vietnam international footballers